Cyril Tawney (12 October 1930 – 21 April 2005) was an English singer-songwriter and a proponent of the traditional songs of the West of England, as well as traditional and modern maritime songs.

Biography and notable works
Tawney was born in Gosport, Hampshire, England. Perhaps because of the family tradition of maritime service, Tawney joined the Royal Navy at the age of sixteen, serving for thirteen years, several of which were spent in submarines. During this period he developed his lifelong interest in English traditional music.

While still in the Navy in 1957, he performed on an Alan Lomax radio show broadcast on Christmas Day, Sing Christmas and the Turn of the Year.  He appeared on television on the following Easter Sunday. It went well and soon he had a weekly television spot and a networked show, Watch Aboard.  Encouraged by these successes, Tawney left the Navy early in 1959 to become a full-time professional musician and broadcaster. He earned his living in this way for 44 years, making him Britain's longest-standing professional folksinger.

Tawney continued to work in broadcasting and had a weekly radio show, Folkspin.  Meanwhile, he researched the traditional songs of southwest England and 20th Century Royal Navy songs. In the early 1960s, he established his first folk club in Plymouth, where he met his wife Rosemary. He founded the West of England Folk Centre, and was instrumental in setting up folk clubs in other places in the region. He is often referred to as the founding father of the West Country folk revival.

His song "The Oggie Man" written in 1959, appeared on the album A Cold Wind Blows on the Elektra ’66 label. It reappeared in 1971 on the Decca Record Company Ltd album, The World of Folk. The song tells the story of the demise of the 'Oggie Man' from the Devonport Naval Dockyard, at a time when old-fashioned "fast food" was being replaced by the more modern purveyors of hot dogs (and all) (the "big boys" of the song). The Oggie Man had until that time offered his oggies (pasties) to sailors returning from sea, or from shore leave, from a box at the Albert Gate of the dock. It has been suggested that the sale of oggies here dated back to the 1700s.

The first verse of "Oggie Man" runs

<blockquote>
And the rain's softly falling and the Oggie man's no more.
I can't hear him calling like I used to before I came through the gateway and I heard the sergeant say"The big boys are a coming, see their stands across the way"And the rains softly falling and the Oggie man's no more...</blockquote>

In addition to presenting traditional ditties, Tawney composed a number of his own songs, the majority being written when he was in the Royal Navy and relating to that period – for example, "Chicken on a Raft", which belongs to the call and response style of sea shanties. The song makes reference to an unpopular dish served in the Royal Navy, consisting of fried egg on fried bread and called "chicken on a raft."  The chorus is as follows:

Chicken on a raft on a Monday morning,
Oh, what a terrible sight to see,
The Dabtoes forrard and the dustmen aft,
Sittin' there a'pickin' at a chicken on a raft!

The song was recorded by The Young Tradition, on their 1967 EP also titled Chicken on a Raft.

Tawney's song, "Sally Free And Easy", written in the late 1950s, was covered by numerous folk artists, including Carolyn Hester, Dorris Henderson and John Renbourn, Davey Graham, Pentangle, The Corries, Marianne Faithfull, Alan Stivell and Bob Dylan.  The song is about an affair Tawney had with a girl who cheated on him.
"... and when he was out in Gibraltar during the war, he was in the submarine service and he had rather an unfortunate affair with a girl, who two-timed him and her name was Sally and he wrote a song about it called "Sally Free and Easy". – Roy Williamson, introducing the song on the album "The Corries in Concert"

Beginning in 1972, Tawney studied English and History at Lancaster University. After he graduated, he admitted to a master's degree from the Leeds University Institute of Dialect and Folklife Studies.  In 1987, Tawney's book Grey Funnel Lines: Traditional Song and Verse of the Royal Navy 1900 to 1970, was published by Routledge.

Tawney's last public performance was at Easter 2004, at the Lancaster Maritime Festival. He died of a bacterial infection at Exeter in 2005 after a long illness."Obituaries: Cyril Tawney (1930–2005)", Roy Palmer. Folk Music Journal.  London: 2006. Vol.9, Issue 1;  page 141.

DiscographyThe Outlandish Knight, 1969Children's Songs from Devon and Cornwall, 1970A Mayflower Garland, 1970Down Among the Barley Straw, 1971 (first released 1976)In Port (with The Yetties), 1972I Will Give My Love, 1973In the Naval Spirit, 1987 (MC)Round the Buoy, 1989 (MC)Sally Free and Easy, 1990 (MC)Sailor's Delight, 1990 (MC)Down the Hatch, 1994Man Of Honour, 1997Navy Cuts, 2001  (Compilation)Live at Holsteins: Chicago 1981, 2007The Song Goes On'', 2014 (Compilation)

Songs
Songs written by Cyril Tawney include:
"Cheering the Queen"
"Chicken on a Raft" 
"Five-foot Flirt"
"Grey Funnel Line"
"The Ballad of Sammy's Bar"
"Sally Free and Easy"
"Stanley the Rat"
"The Lean and Unwashed Tiffy"
"The Suit of Grey"
"The Oggie Man"
"On a Monday Morning"

Notes

References

External links
Cyril Tawney website.
chickenonaraft.com

1930 births
2005 deaths
People from Gosport
English male singers
English songwriters
English folk singers
Royal Navy sailors
Maritime music
Alumni of Lancaster University
20th-century English singers
20th-century British male singers
British male songwriters
20th-century Royal Navy personnel
Military personnel from Hampshire